Campbell High School may refer to:

Australia
Campbell High School (Canberra)

United States
Campbell High School (California), Campbell, California
Campbell High School (Georgia), Smyrna, Georgia
Campbell High School (New Hampshire), Litchfield, New Hampshire
Fort Campbell High School, located on the Tennessee side of Fort Campbell, a major U.S. Army base of the same name that straddles the Kentucky-Tennessee border
James Campbell High School, Ewa Beach, Hawaii
Campbell County High School (Kentucky), Alexandria, Kentucky
Campbell County Comprehensive High School, Jacksboro, Tennessee
Campbell County High School (Wyoming), Gillette, Wyoming